The Cuthberts Building is a Victorian style building found in the city of Johannesburg. The building was designed by architects Stucke & Bannister. Construction of the building began in 1903 and completed in 1904. It rapidly became a major landmark in the mining town and was declared a National Monument on 27 June 1986.

References

Buildings and structures in Johannesburg
Bank buildings in South Africa
Heritage Buildings in Johannesburg